Jacques Chevalier (13 March 1882 – 19 April 1962) was a French Catholic philosopher and a politician.

Chevalier was born in Cérilly, Allier, educated at the École normale supérieure and the University of Oxford and taught at the Faculty of Letters in Grenoble. He was a specialist of Plato and author of many books, mainly about the history of philosophy.

A friend of Lord Halifax, he was also a Minister for education in 1941 under the Vichy Regime, and was as such the only member of the government to be present at the funeral of the philosopher Henri Bergson. 
A devout Catholic, he attempted to eradicate the anti-religious feeling in educational circles and consequently closed the "Écoles Normales", which had been created in each "département" by the François Guizot law of 1833 to prepare teachers for elementary classes, replacing them with "Instituts de formation professionnelle". The anti-clerical Collaborationists opposed him however, and he had to step down (he was replaced by the historian Jérôme Carcopino); his reform was eventually abolished and the "Écoles Normales" were recreated.

References
 Jeanne Dubois, Deux architectes pour reconstruire la France : Frédéric Mistral et Jacques Chevalier, Avignon, Les Livres Nouveaux, 1941.

1882 births
1962 deaths
People from Allier
Lycée Henri-IV alumni
Lycée Hoche alumni
École Normale Supérieure alumni
20th-century French philosophers
French historians of philosophy
French Roman Catholics
People of Vichy France
French Ministers of National Education
Order of the Francisque recipients
Chevaliers of the Légion d'honneur
Members of the Académie des sciences morales et politiques
French male non-fiction writers
20th-century French male writers